Castel del Piano is a town and comune (municipality) of Province of Grosseto in the  Tuscany, central Italy.

History
The area of Castel del Piano is known to have been inhabited in prehistoric times, but the town itself is mentioned for the first time in a document from 890 AD. From 1175 to 1321 it was a possession of the Aldobrandeschi family. After the fall of the Republic of Siena, it became part of the Grand Duchy of Tuscany.

Government

Frazioni 
The municipality is formed by the municipal seat of Castel del Piano and the villages (frazioni) of Montegiovi and Montenero d'Orcia.

List of mayors

Culture
The city is divided into four contrade (quarters) which take part in a palio held every 8 September. The palio was raced for the first time in 1402.

The contrade are:
Borgo
Monumento
Poggio
Storte

Main sights
Chiesa della Propositura (15th century church)
Church of Santa Maria delle Grazie

See also
Monte Amiata

External links
 Southern Tuscany - Map It Out! Useful travel information and updated events in Castel del Piano and Southern Tuscany

Cities and towns in Tuscany